Standings and results for Group 7 of the UEFA Euro 1992 qualifying tournament.

Group 7 consisted of England, Poland, the Republic of Ireland and Turkey.

Final table

Results

Goalscorers

References
UEFA website

Attendances - 

Group 7
1990–91 in English football
Qual
1990–91 in Republic of Ireland association football
1991–92 in Republic of Ireland association football
1990–91 in Polish football
1991–92 in Polish football
1990–91 in Turkish football
1991–92 in Turkish football